Filipino spaghetti is a Filipino adaptation of Italian spaghetti with Bolognese sauce. It has a distinctively sweet sauce, usually made from tomato sauce sweetened with brown sugar and banana ketchup. It is typically topped with sliced hot dogs or smoked longganisa sausages, giniling (ground meat), and grated cheese. It is regarded as a comfort food in Philippine cuisine. It is typically served on almost any special occasion, especially on children's birthdays.

Origins
The dish is believed to date back to the period between the 1940s and the 1960s. During the American Commonwealth Period, a shortage of tomato supplies in the Second World War forced the local development of banana ketchup. Spaghetti with Bolognese sauce was introduced by the Americans and was tweaked to suit the local Filipino predilection for sweet dishes.

Description

Filipino spaghetti is relatively cheap and easy to make, which is part of the reason for its popularity. First, minced garlic and onions are sautéed in oil in a large pan until they caramelize. The giniling (ground meat) is added and cooked until it is brown. The sliced hot dogs are then added, though it can be replaced with other processed meat like smoked longganisa sausages, ham, Vienna sausages, meatballs, luncheon meat, spam, or corned beef. It is cooked for a few more minutes before the tomato sauce and tomato paste mixture is poured into the pan. Beef stock, mushroom soup, or evaporated milk may also be added. This is sweetened with a bit of banana ketchup or brown sugar, and spiced to taste with salt and black pepper. Other common sweeteners include condensed milk, syrup, or even carbonated soft drinks. It is boiled until it reduces to the right consistency. Some people use store-bought spaghetti sauce as the base for convenience that, in the Philippines, may already be sold in Filipino-style flavors.

The spaghetti pasta noodles are almost always store-bought. They are cooked usually to al dente consistency. They may be added directly to the sauce and pre-mixed, or served separately with a large amount of sauce poured over them. Grated or cubed cheese (usually Cheddar) is added before serving, though sometimes the cheese is infused in the sauce or melted over the pasta.

Other ingredients that may be added to the sauce include finely minced red and green bell peppers and carrots.

Cultural significance
Filipino spaghetti has great cultural significance for Filipinos as a comfort food. It is almost always served on special occasions, especially on children's birthdays. As such, most Filipinos attach a nostalgic fondness to the dish.

Filipino spaghetti is a unique offering of fast food chains in the Philippines. It is part of the regular menu of the Philippine branches of Jollibee, McDonald's, and KFC, among others.

See also

 Barbecue spaghetti
Baasto, Somali word for pasta, with some dishes being eaten with a banana
 Cincinnati chili, another example of a fusion-cuisine spaghetti dish
 Embutido
 Menudo (stew)
 Naporitan, a similar dish from Japan
 Hawaiian pizza
 Sopas
 SpaghettiOs
 Macaroni salad
 Pancit

References

External links

Philippine noodle dishes
Spaghetti dishes
Fast food